Karly Gaitán Morales (Managua, Nicaragua, March 25, 1980) is a Nicaraguan writer, journalist, and film historian.

Early years and education
She was born and raised in Managua, Nicaragua. She graduated from the Universidad Centroamericana (UCA) in Managua, Faculty of Communication. She obtained a diploma in Social Communication and Written Press.

Literary work 
She is a contributor for La Prensa Literaria, the Nuevo Amanecer Cultural and Voces de La Prensa. She is a member of the Nicaraguan Association of Women Writers, in Spanish, Asociación Nicaragüense de Escritoras (ANIDE). She is a board member of the Foundation for Cinematography and Images, in Spanish, Fundación para la Cinematografía y la imagen (FUCINE).

In 2012, she published her first book titled An interview with Sergio Ramírez. Interviews. Articles. Chronicles, original title in Spanish Cita con Sergio Ramírez. Entrevistas. Artículos. Crónicas, first edition 2012 Universidad Autónoma de Nuevo León, Monterrey, Mexico, about the Nicaraguan writer Sergio Ramírez in commemoration of his 50th anniversary as a writer. The prologue for this book was written by the Nicaraguan writer Luis Rocha Urtecho. This book was officially presented at the Feria Internacional del Libro de Guadalajara, Feria Internacional del Libro del Palacio de Minería in Mexico City, Feria Internacional del Libro de París (Salon du livre de Paris), and the Miami Book Fair International. The second edition has a prologue by the Costa Rican writer Carlos Cortés.

Gaitán Morales has compiled the history of cinematography in Nicaragua into a book titled To Conquer a Dream. The History of Cinema in Nicaragua, original title in Spanish, A la conquista de un sueño. Historia del cine en Nicaragua, with a presentation on the back cover by the Chilean writer Antonio Skármeta. This book covers the history of Nicaraguan films starting from the late 1800s to the present and it has been dubbed, by writer Rafael Lara, as the first "biography" of Nicaraguan cinema.

Published work
Cita con Sergio Ramírez. Entrevistas. Artículos. Crónicas. (2012) Universidad Autónoma de Nuevo León, Monterrey, México
A la conquista de un sueño. Historia del cine en Nicaragua (2014) Managua, Nicaragua

References

External links
  Cita con Sergio Ramírez o acompañando al escritor (Spanish) Nuevo Amanecer Cultural, Nicaragua, by Isolda Rodriguez Rosales. Retrieved 2014-05-19.
  Escritoras de Nicaragua (Spanish) Escritoras de Nicaragua, Biographies. Retrieved 2014-05-19.
Periodista nicaragüense presenta su libro Cita con Sergio Ramírez (Spanish) by Agencia EFE. Retrieved 2014-05-19.
La hazaña de hacer cine en Nicaragua (Spanish) Nicanoticias, Nicaragua, by Ricardo Cuadra. Retrieved 2014-05-19.
La Malinche o Doña Luisa de Rosario Aguilar (Spanish) Tortilla con Sal, Nicaragua, by Karly Gaitán Morales. Retrieved 2014-05-19.
 Frida Kalho...pata de palo! (Spanish) Nuevo Amanecer Cultural, Nicaragua, by Karly Gaitán Morales. Retrieved 2014-06-01.
One hundred personalities of the Nicaraguan cinema: Rossana Lacayo  (Spanish) Carátula Magazine, Nicaragua, by Karly Gaitán Morales. Retrieved 2014-06-01.
Women and cinema in Nicaragua (Spanish) Carátula Magazine, Nicaragua, by Karly Gaitán Morales. Retrieved 2014-06-01.
 YouTube Interview with Karly Gaitán Morales (Spanish) Interview conducted by Lenin Solano Ambía. Retrieved 2014-06-01.
 YouTube Book Presentation by Karly Gaitán Morales (Spanish) Video by Cesia Gaitán. Retrieved 2014-06-01.

1980 births
Living people
21st-century Nicaraguan poets
People from Managua
Nicaraguan women poets
Nicaraguan journalists
Nicaraguan women journalists
21st-century Nicaraguan women writers
Central American University (Managua) alumni